Sloan Creek is a stream in eastern Cape Girardeau County, Missouri, in the United States. It is a tributary to the Mississippi River.

The stream was named after the owner of a local mill.

See also
List of rivers of Missouri

References

Rivers of Cape Girardeau County, Missouri
Rivers of Missouri